Heinrich Theodor Rötscher (20 September 1803 – 9 April 1871) was a German theatre critic and theorist. One strong influence on his writing was Hegel.

Biography
Rötscher was born in Mittenwalde, and studied philology and philosophy at the University of Berlin. From 1828 he was a gymnasium teacher in Bromberg (modern-day Bydgoszcz, Poland). In 1842 he moved back to Berlin and dedicated himself to writing and theorizing about theatre.  In Berlin, he was the dramatic critic for the Spenersche Zeitung.

Selected works
 Aristophanes und sein Zeitalter, an attempt to understand the ancient Greek comedian Aristophanes in light of Hegel's philosophy (1827)
 Abhandlungen zur Philosophie der Kunst, also strongly tinged with Hegelianism (1837–47)
 Die Kunst der dramatischen Darstellung, his principal work: an attempt to treat theatre criticism in a scientific manner (1841–46; 2nd ed. 1864)
 Das Schauspielwesen (1843)
 Über Byrons Manfred (1844)
 Seydelmanns Leben und Wirken (1845)
 Shakespeare in seinen höchsten Charaktergebilden (1864)
 Dramaturgische und ästhetische Abhandlungen (1864, 1867)
 Dramaturgische Blätter (1865)
 Entwickelung dramatischer Charaktere aus Lessings, Schillers und Goethes Werken (1869)

Notes

References
  (page image at Wikimedia Commons)
 
 A Pallas nagy lexikona

External links
Aristophanes und sein Zeitalter at Google Books

1803 births
1871 deaths
People from Dahme-Spreewald
German schoolteachers
German journalists
German male journalists
German critics
19th-century German journalists
19th-century German male writers